FC Qyzyljar is a Kazakhstani football club, playing in the north Kazakh city of Petropavl at the Karasai Stadium. They are founding members of the Kazakhstan Premier League. Qyzyljar is the name of a district in the city. They are two time runners-up of the Premier league (1999 and 2000).

History

Names
1968 : Founded as Avangard
1970 : Renamed Metallist
1979 : Renamed Avangard
1990 : Renamed Metallist
1998 : Renamed Yesil
1999 : Renamed Aksess-Yesil
2000 : Renamed Aksess-Golden Greyn
2001 : Renamed Yesil-Bogatyr
2009 : Renamed Qyzyljar

Domestic history

European history

Notes
 QR: Qualifying round

Current squad

External links
 Official site
 Web-page "V Contacte"
 Return of "bogatyrs" or as football became a religion in Petropavlovsk
 Old fan's site
 Old unofficial site

References

 
Kyzylzhar, FC
Kyzylzhar
1968 establishments in the Kazakh Soviet Socialist Republic